Curt Mauritz Axel Östberg (17 February 1905 – 30 March 1969) was a Swedish tennis player.

Tennis career
Östberg represented the Swedish Davis Cup team in 1929, 1933–34 and 1936–37. His first match in 1929 was against South Africa in Saltsjobaden, where he and his teammates, Sune Malmström and Henning Muller, suffered a 5–0 loss. He played a total of 17 matches and won 6 of them. Three of the wins were in doubles with his partner Kalle Schröder. In 1946 he was appointed as non-playing captain for the Swedish team.

Östberg made two appearances at the Wimbledon Championships, in 1929 and 1934, losing in the first round on both occasions.

See also
List of Sweden Davis Cup team representatives

References

External links
 
 

1905 births
1969 deaths
Swedish male tennis players
Tennis players from Stockholm
20th-century Swedish people